In Concert is the twelfth overall album, seventh North American album, and first live concert album by the a cappella group Rockapella. It was recorded live on December 9, 2000 at the Lobero Theatre in Santa Barbara, California. A corresponding DVD was also filmed as part of a PBS Special. The DVD contains a shortened version of Jeff Thacher's vocal percussion solo during "Where In The World Is Carmen Sandiego?" and does not include "Long Cool Woman In A Black Dress."

A Japanese release on Rentrak Records followed in 2002 with the same track listing, but different cover art. It was also re-released on Shakariki Records in 2004 and is available on iTunes.

Track listing

Personnel
Scott Leonard – high tenor
Kevin Wright – tenor
Elliott Kerman – baritone
Barry Carl – bass
Jeff Thacher – vocal percussion

Rockapella albums
2001 live albums
2001 video albums
Live video albums